Aarik Wilson (born October 25, 1982, in Reno, Nevada) is an American long jumper and triple jumper. He attended Indiana University in Bloomington, Indiana.

US Olympic Trials Triple Jump Champion 2008, US National Indoor Triple Jump Champion 2008, US National Outdoor Triple Jump Champion 2007, US National Indoor Triple Jump Champion 2007(17.28 m), 3rd National Indoor Championships in Long Jump 2007(8.00 m). 
He also finished fifth at the 2003 Pan American Games and sixth at the 2006 World Athletics Final. He competed at the 2006 IAAF World Indoor Championships without reaching the final round.

His performances in 2006 earned him a ninth place on the Track & Field News world ranking; his first ranking among the top ten.

Wilson also holds the Nevada Interscholastic Athletic Association (NIAA) 4A State Meet record in the triple jump, with a mark of 51-01.25 feet, set in 2001 as a senior at Churchill County High School in Fallon, NV.

References

External links
 
 
 
 
 

1982 births
Living people
American male long jumpers
American male triple jumpers
Athletes (track and field) at the 2003 Pan American Games
Athletes (track and field) at the 2008 Summer Olympics
Olympic track and field athletes of the United States
Sportspeople from Reno, Nevada
Pan American Games track and field athletes for the United States
People from Fallon, Nevada